Hyadesiidae is a family of mites belonging to the order Sarcoptiformes.

Genera:
 Alophagus Hughes, 1955
 Amhyadesia Fain & Ganning, 1979
 Hyadesia Megnin, 1889

References 

Acari